"Where Is the Love" is a popular song written by Ralph MacDonald and William Salter, and recorded by Roberta Flack and Donny Hathaway. Released in 1972 from their album, Roberta Flack & Donny Hathaway. It peaked at number five on the Billboard Hot 100 singles chart and spent a week each at number one on the Billboard Easy Listening chart (July 1972) and R&B chart (August 1972). Billboard ranked it as the No. 58 song for 1972. The song won a Grammy Award for Best Pop Performance by a Duo or Group with Vocals.

Chart performance

Weekly charts

Year-end charts

Cover versions

There have been numerous cover versions of this song:
The Ray Conniff Singers recorded a version in 1972 on their album Alone Again (Naturally) (not to be confused with the album by the same name by Andy Williams as mentioned below).
Helen Reddy recorded a version in 1972 on her Capitol album I Am Woman. 
South Vietnamese band The Dreamers recorded a cover version in 1972, which was very popular in their home country.
Both Jerry Vale and Andy Williams released versions in 1972, each on different albums named Alone Again (Naturally).
Sérgio Mendes & Brasil '77 had a top 20 easy listening hit with their 1973 cover version. 
Liza Minnelli covered it on her 1973 album The Singer.
Icelandic singer Þuríður Sigurðardóttir covered it in 1973 as "Hvar er min ást?" on the album "Þuríður & Pálmi", with Icelandic words by Þorsteinn Eggertsson.
Eurovision Song Contest winner Dana recorded a version in the mid-1970s.
Jazz legend Woody Herman recorded an Alan Broadbent arrangement for his album Children of Lima that featured a bassoon solo by Frank Tiberi.
Stephanie Mills and Robert Brookins recorded a version that peaked at number 18 on the R&B Songs chart in 1988. 
Guitarist Zachary Breaux recorded an instrumental version for his album Groovin in 1992.
Australian singer Rick Price and New Zealand singer Margaret Urlich had a hit on the Australian charts with the song in 1993.
In 1995, Jesse & Trina covered the song for the soundtrack to the film Dead Presidents, and this version reached number 40 on the R&B chart.
 In 1996, Paul Jackson Jr covered the song on the album Never Alone Duets.
Amel Larrieux and Glenn Lewis were featured on a version on Stanley Clarke's 12 To the bass, which was nominated for Best R&B Performance by a Duo or Group with Vocals at the 2004 Grammy Awards.
Dutch singer Trijntje Oosterhuis and American singer Raul Midon recorded a version for Midon's album State of Mind in 2006.
American pop singer Johnny Mathis covered the song on his 2008 album, A Night to Remember.

Mica Paris and Will Downing version

British soul singer Mica Paris and American singer-songwriter Will Downing released a cover of "Where Is the Love" in 1989 for Paris' debut album So Good.

"Where Is the Love" debuted at number twenty-eight on the UK Singles Chart, peaking at number nineteen in its second week before accumulating a total of eight weeks on the chart.

Track listingCD singleVinylCharts

Rick Price and Margaret Urlich version

"Where is the Love" was recorded by Australian singer songwriter Rick Price and New Zealand-born singer-songwriter Margaret Urlich. It was released on November 29, 1993, and peaked at number 31 in Australia. It was included as a bonus track on Ulrich's 1994 album, Live.

In 1993, Price and Urlich were part of Export Music Australia (EMA) and Austrade's second Wizards of Oz promotion. They toured Japan together with the group Yothu Yindi.

At the ARIA Music Awards of 1994, the song was nominated for ARIA Award for Best Adult Contemporary Album but lost to The Journey by Tommy Emmanuel.

Track listingCD single (659884 2)'
 "Where Is the Love" – 2:58
 "If You Were My Baby" by Rick Price (acoustic) – 4:14
 "Love Train" by Margaret Ulrich (live) – 4:21

Charts

See also
List of number-one adult contemporary singles of 1972 (U.S.)
List of number-one R&B singles of 1972 (U.S.)

References

External links
 

1972 singles
1989 singles
Songs written by Ralph MacDonald
Roberta Flack songs
Donny Hathaway songs
Song recordings produced by Arif Mardin
4th & B'way Records singles
Soul ballads
American rhythm and blues songs
Male–female vocal duets
1972 songs
Atlantic Records singles
Rick Price songs
1993 singles
Columbia Records singles
Torch songs
Mica Paris songs